Rainer Grob (born 5 December 1973) is a Chilean alpine skier. He competed in two events at the 1998 Winter Olympics.

References

1973 births
Living people
Chilean male alpine skiers
Olympic alpine skiers of Chile
Alpine skiers at the 1998 Winter Olympics
People from Osorno, Chile
20th-century Chilean people